
Gmina Buczkowice is a rural gmina (administrative district) in Bielsko County, Silesian Voivodeship, in southern Poland.

Villages
Gmina Buczkowice contains the villages and settlements of Buczkowice, Godziszka, Kalna and Rybarzowice.

Neighbouring gminas
Gmina Buczkowice is bordered by the town of Szczyrk and by the gminas of Lipowa, Łodygowice and Wilkowice.

Twin towns – sister cities

Gmina Buczkowice is twinned with:
 Dobrá, Czech Republic

References

Buczkowice
Bielsko County